John Blackwell may refer to:

 John Blackwell (Alun) (1797–1840), Welsh poet
 John Blackwell (engineer) (c. 1775–1840), English civil engineer
 John Blackwell (musician) (1973–2017), drummer in the New Power Generation
 John Blackwell (referee), English football referee and soldier
 Ken Blackwell (John Kenneth Blackwell, born 1948), American politician, author, and conservative activist